The 1998 UAW-GM Quality 500 was the 28th stock car race of the 1998 NASCAR Winston Cup Series season and the 39th iteration of the event. The race was held on Sunday, October 4, 1998, in Concord, North Carolina, at Charlotte Motor Speedway, a 1.5 miles (2.4 km) permanent quad-oval. The race took the scheduled 334 laps to complete. At race's end, Roush Racing driver Mark Martin would manage to dominate most of the race to take his 29th career NASCAR Winston Cup Series victory and his seventh and final victory of the season. To fill out the podium, Bill Davis Racing driver Ward Burton and Roush Racing driver Jeff Burton would finish second and third, respectively.

Background 

Lowe's Motor Speedway is a motorsports complex located in Concord, North Carolina, United States 13 miles from Charlotte, North Carolina. The complex features a 1.5 miles (2.4 km) quad oval track that hosts NASCAR racing including the prestigious Coca-Cola 600 on Memorial Day weekend and the NEXTEL All-Star Challenge, as well as the UAW-GM Quality 500. The speedway was built in 1959 by Bruton Smith and is considered the home track for NASCAR with many race teams located in the Charlotte area. The track is owned and operated by Speedway Motorsports Inc. (SMI) with Marcus G. Smith (son of Bruton Smith) as track president.

Entry list 

 (R) denotes rookie driver.

Practice

First practice 
The first practice session was held on Wednesday, September 30, at 1:30 PM EST. The session would last for three hours and 30 minutes.

Second practice 
The second practice session was held on Thursday, October 1.

Third practice 
The third practice session was held on Saturday, October 3, at 9:00 AM EST. The session would last for one hour.

Final practice 
The final practice session, sometimes referred to as Happy Hour, was held Saturday, October 3, after the preliminary 1998 All Pro Bumper to Bumper 300. The session would last for one hour.

Qualifying 
Qualifying was split into two rounds. The first round was held on Wednesday, September 30, at 7:00 PM EST. Each driver would have one lap to set a time. During the first round, the top 25 drivers in the round would be guaranteed a starting spot in the race. If a driver was not able to guarantee a spot in the first round, they had the option to scrub their time from the first round and try and run a faster lap time in a second round qualifying run, held on Thursday, October 1, at 1:30 PM EST. As with the first round, each driver would have one lap to set a time. On January 24, 1998, NASCAR would announce that the amount of provisionals given would be increased from last season. Positions 26-36 would be decided on time, while positions 37-43 would be based on provisionals. Six spots are awarded by the use of provisionals based on owner's points. The seventh is awarded to a past champion who has not otherwise qualified for the race. If no past champion needs the provisional, the next team in the owner points will be awarded a provisional.

Five drivers would fail to qualify: Jeff Green, Tony Raines, Andy Hillenburg, Dave Marcis, and Randy MacDonald.

Full qualifying results

Race results

References 

1998 NASCAR Winston Cup Series
NASCAR races at Charlotte Motor Speedway
October 1998 sports events in the United States
1998 in sports in North Carolina